In baseball, a sinker or sinking fastball is a type of fastball which has significant downward and horizontal movement and is known for inducing ground balls. Pitchers capable of utilizing the sinker are able to throw the pitch almost exclusively, as it forces weak contact and ground balls, allowing them to rely less on secondary pitches in order to change speeds. While coaches agree that this pitch is very similar to the two-seam fastball, a two-seamer tends to have more lateral movement than a sinker.

History

Before the 1950s, pitchers did not know what caused their pitches to sink or "hop". They regarded either ability as a "gift from heaven". Bill James cites Curt Simmons as the first pitcher to be able to throw both sinkers and rising fastballs, apparently indicating that it was not known how to make a pitch sink and how to make one hop.

Throwing mechanics
One method of throwing the sinker is to simply grip the baseball along the two seams and throw it similar to a fastball. Some pitchers use a downward motion on their wrist when throwing it. The pitcher's palm turns to the right at release for a right handed pitcher. This causes a sharper sink, but also has a greater risk of a wild pitch. This wrist movement is also called pronation.

To effectively throw the sinker, one must apply pressure with their fingers on the inside edge of the baseball when throwing. This will tilt the spin axis away from a traditional backspin and also reduce overall spin rate, both of which will help the ball sink and add lateral movement to it.

Effects on the batter
The sinker drops 6 to 9 inches more than a typical four seam fastball, which causes batters to hit ground balls more often than other fastballs, mostly due to the tilted sidespin on the ball. Horizontal movement also occurs when sinkers are thrown. Sinkerball pitchers can often get called strikes and swinging strikes on the pitch.

Notable sinkerballers

Bill Swift
Greg Maddux
Matt Albers
Brad Bergesen
Burke Badenhop
Zack Britton
Kevin Brown
Trevor Cahill
Aaron Cook
Kevin Correia
Camilo Doval
Jeurys Familia
Scott Feldman
Jon Garland
Roy Halladay
Roberto Hernández
Orel Hershiser
Chris Heston
Jonathan Loáisiga
Luke Hochevar
Tim Hudson
Tommy John
Jim Johnson
Randy Jones
Jeff Karstens
Kyle Kendrick
Dallas Keuchel
Mike Leake
Kameron Loe
Mickey Lolich
 Derek Lowe
Frankie Montas
Seth Maness
Jason Marquis
Justin Masterson
Jackie Mitchell
Sergio Mitre
Lance McCullers Jr.
Charlie Morton
Carl Pavano
Brandon League
Mike Pelfrey
Carlos Silva
Bob Stanley
Mel Stottlemyre
Mike Timlin
Chien-Ming Wang
Brandon Webb
Logan Webb
Randy Wells
Jake Westbrook
Jerome Williams
Carlos Zambrano
Scott Erickson
Ronald Belisario
Steve Cishek
Sandy Alcantara

See also

Two-seam fastball

References

Baseball pitches